The 87th Division was created in February 1949 under the Regulation of the Redesignations of All Organizations and Units of the Army, issued by Central Military Commission on November 1, 1948, basing on the 33rd Brigade, 11th Column of the Huadong Field Army, which was activated in April 1948.

The division was part of the 29th Corps. Under the flag of the 87th Division, it was engaged in several battles in the Chinese Civil War, including the Shanghai Campaign. 

The division was then composed of:
259th Regiment
260th Regiment
261st Regiment

In October 1950 the division was transferred to Fujian Military Region's control with the disbandment of the 29th Corps.

In July 1952, the division was reconstituted as the 13th Public Security Division(). The division was mainly tasked with the defense of Pingtan Island and Nanri Island in Fujian. The division was under the control of Public Security Troops Command, Huadong Military Region.

The division was then composed of:
37th Public Security Regiment
38th Public Security Regiment
39th Public Security Regiment

In June 1956, the division was reconstituted into a garrison formation. In February 1957 the division was reorganized as the 13th Garrison Division().

In November 1969, the division was renamed as 2nd Garrison Division of Fuzhou Military Region().

In September 1985, following the disbandment of Fuzhou Military Region, the division was redesignated as 12th Garrison Division of Nanjing Military Region().

In 1992, the division was reconstituted as 12th Coastal Defense Division(). The division was then composed of:
45th Coastal Defense Regiment - former 261st
45th Coastal Defense Regiment - former 259th
45th Coastal Defense Regiment - former 260th

In April 2017 the division was reduced as the 303rd Coastal Defense Brigade(). It is now serving as a coastal defense formation of the Eastern Theatre Command Ground Forces.

References

中国人民解放军各步兵师沿革, 中国人民解放军各步兵师沿革(上)_燕山明月_新浪博客

People's Liberation Army